Ephraim J. Wilson Farm Complex is a historic home and farm located near Palmyra, Marion County, Missouri.  The house was built about 1842, and is a two-story, Federal style brick I-house with a rear frame addition built around 1889. Also on the property are the contributing timber frame bank barn built by a Mennonite of Pennsylvania German extraction in 1888, and an ice house. It was added to the National Register of Historic Places in 1982.

References

Houses on the National Register of Historic Places in Missouri
Farms on the National Register of Historic Places in Missouri
Federal architecture in Missouri
Houses completed in 1842
Buildings and structures in Marion County, Missouri
National Register of Historic Places in Marion County, Missouri
1842 establishments in Missouri